The year 1996 in architecture involved some significant architectural events and new buildings.

Events
 June 30 – The historic Sands Hotel on the Las Vegas Strip, designed by architect Wayne McAllister, is demolished.
 date unknown
 The Stirling Prize is instituted in memory of James Stirling. The first winner is Stephen Hodder for the Centenary Building, University of Salford, Greater Manchester (opened in the same year).
 Eden Project, Cornwall near St Austell is designed by Nicholas Grimshaw (completed 2001).
 The Pringle Richards Sharratt partnership is established in London.

Buildings and structures

Buildings opened
 March 15 – Arken Museum of Modern Art in Copenhagen, designed by Søren Robert Lund.
 May 26 – Hong Kong China Temple, Hong Kong (inaugurated).
 October 3 – Museum Tinguely in Basel, Switzerland, designed by Mario Botta.
 November – Museum für Gegenwart (contemporary art museum) in former Hamburger Bahnhof in Berlin, converted by Josef Paul Kleihues.

Buildings completed

 Niterói Contemporary Art Museum, Brazil, designed by Oscar Niemeyer.
 Fruit Museum, Yamanashi, Japan, designed by Itsuko Hasegawa.
 Aukrust Centre, Alvdal, Norway, designed by Sverre Fehn.
 Melbourne Convention and Exhibition Centre in Melbourne, Australia, designed by Denton Corker Marshall.
 Shun Hing Square, Shenzhen, designed by K. Y. Cheung Design Associates, the tallest building in Asia until it is surpassed the following year.
 Therme Vals in Switzerland, designed by Peter Zumthor.
 The Dancing House (Nationale-Nederlanden building) in Prague, designed by Vlado Milunić with Frank Gehry.
 Maggie's Centre, Edinburgh, a drop-in cancer care centre; building conversion by Richard Murphy.
 Orphanage (first stage), Chhebetor, Nepal, designed by Hans Olav Hesseberg and Sixten Rahiff of Bergen School of Architecture.
 81 Mill Street, Osney, Oxford, England, a house designed for himself by Adrian James.

Awards
 American Academy of Arts and Letters Gold Medal – Philip Johnson.
 Architecture Firm Award – Skidmore, Owings & Merrill LLP.
 European Union Prize for Contemporary Architecture (Mies van der Rohe Prize) – Dominique Perrault for Bibliothèque Nationale de France.
 Grand prix national de l'architecture – Bernard Tschumi.
 Praemium Imperiale Architecture Laureate – Tadao Ando.
 Pritzker Prize – Rafael Moneo.
 Prix de l'Équerre d'Argent – Pierre-Louis Faloci.
 RAIA Gold Medal – Denton Corker Marshall.
 RIBA Royal Gold Medal – Harry Seidler.
 Stirling Prize – Stephen Hodder, Centenary Building, University of Salford.
 Thomas Jefferson Medal in Architecture – Jane Jacobs.
 Twenty-five Year Award – United States Air Force Academy Cadet Chapel.
 UIA Gold Medal – Rafael Moneo.

Deaths
 February 14 – Alejandro de la Sota, Spanish architect (born 1913)
 May 19 – Roy Mason, American lecturer, writer and futuristic architect (born 1938)
 July 17 – Sir Geoffrey Jellicoe, English landscape architect (born 1900)
 July 27 – Dame Jane Drew, English modernist architect and town planner (born 1911)
 November 23 – Ralph Tubbs, British architect, designer of the Dome of Discovery at the Festival of Britain (born 1912)

References

 
20th-century architecture